Judith C. Vogt (born 1981 Langenbroich) is a German author. She writes fantasy and science fiction literature, young adult literature, and historical novels. She is a role-playing game developer.

Life 
Vogt served an apprenticeship, and worked as a bookseller.

Her first novel, Im Schatten der Essen, was published in 2011 as part of the Aventuria novels series.  Other books were published by the publishers Fantasy Productions and Ulisses, around the world of the fictional continent of Aventuria. Her young adult book trilogy, Die Geister des Landes was published from 2012 .

Together with her husband, the physicist Christian Vogt , she wrote the steampunk novel The Broken Doll published by Verlag Feder & Schwert, the sequel The Lost Doll , the historical two-part Eburonenlied about the Gallic War , the fantasy trilogy The 13 Drawn at Bastei Lübbe and the sci-fi novels Wasteland, and Ace in Space , part of the hit crowdfunded role-playing game, Aces in Space .

As a game developer, she initially wrote adventures and source code within the framework of the Black Eye . Ice & Steam , Scherbenland and Aces in Space, which are independent role-playing settings for the FATE role-playing system. Scherbenland received the German Role Playing Prize in 2018.

The Broken Doll received the 2013 German Fantasy Prize, in the Best German-language Novel category. Parallel to the nomination of the novel, Germany's first crowdfunding short story anthology, Eis und Dampf , was realized together with Feder & Schwert and 10 other authors . Vogt also took over the publication of an anthology on the 1200th anniversary of Charlemagne's death . She was an editor and writer on Roll Inclusive - Diversity and Representation in Pen and Paper Roleplaying .

Like her husband, Vogt is one of the 13 founding members of the Phantastik-Autoren-Netzwerk (PAN). In February 2020, the two announced their departure from the network. 

She lives in Aachen and also works as a translator and journalist. Together with Lena Richter, she runs the nerd culture and role-playing podcast, Genderswapped. Together with Lena Richter and Kathrin Dodenhoeft , she publishes the quarterly queer-feminist fantasy magazine Queer*Welten

References

External links 

 http://www.jcvogt.de/

1981 births
21st-century German novelists
21st-century German women writers
German fantasy writers
German game designers
German science fiction writers
German women novelists
Living people
Women science fiction and fantasy writers
Role-playing game designers